Cotnari is a village and the center of the eponymous commune in Iași County, Romania, in the historical region of Western Moldavia. It is located north-west of Iași and south of Hârlău, in a major wine-producing region of Romania, and is famous for the wine variety known as Grasă de Cotnari. Cârjoaia, the forest of Dumbrava Roșie, and other sites in Cotnari are regional tourist spots.

The commune is composed of eleven villages: Bahluiu, Cârjoaia, Cireșeni, Cotnari, Făgăt, Hodora, Horodiștea, Iosupeni, Lupăria, Valea Racului and Zbereni.

History
Proof of habitation in the area goes back to the Cucuteni culture; a fortress dating from the 6th or 5th century BC was discovered on the nearby Cătălina Hill (nowadays a nature reserve).

First attested in 1448, Cotnari was the site of a strong Roman Catholic community composed mainly of Germans and Magyars. The establishment of vineyards is attributed by local tradition to an initiative of Moldavian Prince Stephen the Great, under whose rule the village rose to the status of alternate residence, while stone structures and roads to serve the wine trade were built in the area.

Its Catholic tradition made the village a target for Reformation in the 1560s, under the rule of the Protestant Prince Ioan Iacob Heraclid: Heraclid built a Latin Renaissance academy (Schola Latina), placed under the leadership of Ioannes Sommerus; the church he built on the site was re-established as a Catholic place of worship after Heraclid's death, and served the community until 1873, when it burned down. In 1641, Cotnari became the regional center of Catholic education, until it was replaced 60 years later by the Jesuit school in Iași.

Natives
Victor Iamandi
Cătălin Moroșanu
Cezar Petrescu

External links
  Official site

Wine regions of Romania
Communes in Iași County
Localities in Western Moldavia